The fourth season of the American comedy television series It's Always Sunny in Philadelphia premiered on FX on September 18, 2008. The season contains 13 episodes and concluded airing on November 20, 2008.

Season synopsis
The Gang gets even crazier this season when Sweet Dee and Charlie become cannibals while Mac and Dennis decide to hunt humans for sport. Later, the gang hatches a plot to counter soaring prices at the pump by stealing and reselling gasoline, then try living the healthy life—by scamming their way to free medical insurance, but not before trying to prove that Paddy's Pub is historically relevant, and kidnapping a newspaper critic who panned their bar. Dee and Frank set out to stop Bruce Mathis (Dee and Dennis's biological father) from donating Barbara's inheritance to a community center for Muslims while Charlie and Mac fake their deaths to escape Mac's convict father, Luther, who vowed in "Dennis Looks Like a Registered Sex Offender" to get revenge on the two of them for screwing up his plan to make amends with the people he terrorized before he was sent away to prison for the first time. 

This season also sees Frank holding a contest to find a new billboard model for the bar and the gang trying to bring good karma to a Hispanic family by rebuilding their hovel. Dennis' erotic memoirs land him in a mental hospital with comedian Sinbad and Matchbox Twenty lead singer, Rob Thomas. Dee and Artemis live it up like the girls on Sex and the City, while Frank and the rest of the gang solve a scatological mystery. Charlie continues to stalk The Waitress, especially in light of news that someone else is having sex with her; then Charlie reworks his "Night Man" song into a sprawling musical to win over The Waitress.

Cast

Main cast
 Charlie Day as Charlie Kelly
 Glenn Howerton as Dennis Reynolds
 Rob McElhenney as Mac
 Kaitlin Olson as Dee Reynolds
 Danny DeVito as Frank Reynolds

Recurring cast
 Mary Elizabeth Ellis as The Waitress
 David Hornsby as Cricket / Colonel Cricket
 Artemis Pebdani as Artemis
 Lynne Marie Stewart as Bonnie Kelly
 Sandy Martin as Mrs. Mac
 Gregory Scott Cummins as Luther Mac

Guest stars
 Zachary Knighton as Random Guy
 Geoff Pierson as Warden
 Keir O'Donnell as Jan
 Fran Kranz as College Student
 Fisher Stevens as Korman
 Rob Thomas as himself
 Sinbad as himself
 Lisa Locicero as Philadelphia Soul Executive
 Mae Laborde as Gladys

Episodes

Reception
The fourth season received positive reviews. On Rotten Tomatoes, it has an approval rating of 100% with an average score of 7.4 out of 10 based on 13 reviews. The website's critical consensus reads, "The Dayman defeats the Nightman and all is Sunny in Philadelphia with this uproariously nasty fourth season."

Home media

References

External links 

 
 

2008 American television seasons
It's Always Sunny in Philadelphia